Lamina may refer to:

Science and technology
 Planar lamina, a two-dimensional planar closed surface with mass and density, in mathematics
 Laminar flow, (or streamline flow) occurs when a fluid flows in parallel layers, with no disruption between the layers 
 Lamina (algae), a structure in seaweeds
 Lamina (anatomy), with several meanings
 Lamina (leaf), the flat part of a leaf, an organ of a plant
 Lamina, the largest petal of a floret in an aster family flowerhead: see 
 Lamina (spider), a genus in the family Toxopidae
 Lamina (neuropil), the most peripheral neuropil of the insect visual system
Nuclear lamina, another structure of a living cell
Basal lamina, a structure of a living cell
Lamina propria, the connective part of the mucous
Lamina of the vertebral arch
Lamination (geology), a layering structure in sedimentary rocks usually less than 1 cm in thickness
 Laminae, a part of the horse hoof
 Laminae, another name for the core lamiids, a clade in botany

See also
 Lamia, a creature from Greek mythology.
 Lamia (Basque mythology), a creature from Basque mythology
 Lamina cribrosa (disambiguation)
 Laminar (disambiguation)